Madison Junior-Senior High School is a public high school near Middletown, Ohio.  It is the only high school in the Madison Local Schools district. The school colors are red, black and white.

Madison's sports teams, known as the Mohawks, participated in the Fort Ancient Valley Conference from 1979 until 1984, when the school left for the Southwestern Buckeye League's Buckeye Division, which consists of smaller schools.

Background 
The Madison High School (Grades 9–12) was recognized in the national rankings of US News Best U.S. High Schools in 2018 and earned a bronze medal. It is ranked a 6/10 on the Great!Schools website.

Shooting 
On February 29, 2016, four students were injured during a shooting in the school's cafeteria. The shooter fled the scene, but was later arrested and charged as an adult with four counts of attempted murder and one count of inducing panic. On June 6, the shooter was sentenced to six years in juvenile detention. The victims' families later filed a lawsuit against him, his family, and the state, alleging that the shooter's parents entrusted him with the gun used in the shooting, and that the weapon was registered to another relative who failed to properly secure it.

Notable alumni 
Shaun Foist, drummer for Breaking Benjamin
Mike McGee, shares the record for fewest putts in a round of golf

References

External links
 District Website

High schools in Butler County, Ohio
Public high schools in Ohio
Public middle schools in Ohio